WBYL (95.5 FM) is a country music formatted radio station commonly known as "Bill 95".  The station is owned by iHeartMedia, Inc. It is a simulcast of WBLJ-FM from Shamokin.

Notable on air personalities include The Bill Breakfast Show with Ted Bennet, Tom Turner,  Lou Kolb, and Lia.

External links
 
 

BYL
Radio stations established in 1983
1983 establishments in Pennsylvania
IHeartMedia radio stations